José Magalhães (born 30 October 1954) is a Portuguese racewalker. He competed in the men's 50 kilometres walk at the 1992 Summer Olympics and the 1996 Summer Olympics.

References

1954 births
Living people
Athletes (track and field) at the 1992 Summer Olympics
Athletes (track and field) at the 1996 Summer Olympics
Portuguese male racewalkers
Olympic athletes of Portugal
Place of birth missing (living people)